The Open de Tenis Ciudad de Pozoblanco is a professional tennis tournament played on outdoor hard courts. It is part of the Association of Tennis Professionals (ATP) Challenger Tour and was part of the ITF Women's Circuit. It was held at the Club Tenis Pozoblanco in Pozoblanco, Spain from 1999 to 2012 before starting back again in 2021.

Past finals

Men's singles

Men's doubles

Women's singles

Women's doubles

External links
ITF Search

 
ATP Challenger Tour
ITF Women's World Tennis Tour
Tretorn SERIE+ tournaments
Hard court tennis tournaments
Recurring sporting events established in 1999